Qeshlaq-e Olya or Qeshlaq Olya may refer to:
 Qeshlaq-e Olya, Ardabil
 Qeshlaq Olya, East Azerbaijan
 Qeshlaq-e Olya, Hamadan
 Qeshlaq-e Olya, Harsin, Kermanshah Province
 Qeshlaq-e Olya, Sahneh, Kermanshah Province